Daniel John Dakich (born August 17, 1962) is an American basketball sportscaster. He is a former player, assistant coach, interim head coach for the Indiana University Hoosiers and former head coach at Bowling Green State University. He currently hosts the radio show Don't @ Me for OutKick.

Playing career
Dakich attended Andrean High School in Merrillville, Indiana. He elected to play basketball for Indiana under coach Bob Knight from 1981 to 1985. He was a team captain during his junior and senior seasons and the Hoosiers finished with an 84–39 record during his career. As a player, he helped Indiana win one Big Ten title (during the 1982–83 season), earn three NCAA Tournament berths and finish as the NIT runner-up his senior season. As a junior, he was named All-Tournament at the Indiana Classic and as a senior he earned similar accolades at the Hoosier Classic.

Dakich is remembered for his defensive effort against Michael Jordan in Indiana's upset of No. 1 ranked North Carolina in the 1984 East Regional semifinal of the NCAA tournament. It was Dakich's sixth start of the year, but Knight assigned him to guard Jordan the afternoon of the game. Knight told him, "Just don't let him dunk on you. That will embarrass you and me both." Dakich commented, "I went back to my room and threw up." Dakich held Jordan to 13 points in Indiana's 72–68 victory, although Jordan spent most of the 2nd half on the bench in foul trouble, with both players ultimately fouling out in what would be Jordan's final college game.

Coaching career

Assistant coach
Dakich was first a graduate assistant coach at Indiana under Bob Knight from 1985–87 and then an assistant coach at Indiana from 1987 to 1997. He helped the Indiana program win 74% (283–101) of its games over the 12 years he served as an assistant coach. The Hoosiers won a national title in the 1986–87 season and earned a spot in the NCAA tournament in each of his 12 seasons on the staff. IU also captured four Big Ten titles while finishing third or better in 9 of his 12 years.

Dakich was the academic monitor on the Indiana basketball staff his last seven years and, under his guidance, every four-year player on the program graduated. He also assisted in the development of six All-Americans and three national Player of the Year candidates, including 1993 Player of the Year Calbert Cheaney.

Head coach
From 1997 to 2007 he served as the head coach at Bowling Green State University where he compiled a record of 156–140. He coached one player who signed a professional contract, including former Indiana Pacers guard Keith McLeod. During Dakich's tenure, BGSU never made it to the NCAA tournament.  Dakich had losing seasons in four of his last five years with BGSU, and resigned as head coach in 2007.

Briefly in 2002, Dakich was named head basketball coach at West Virginia University (WVU) to succeed Gale Catlett.  When Dakich learned that people affiliated with the basketball program may have been guilty of NCAA recruiting rules infractions,thus returning to Bowling Green as head basketball coach after only a week at WVU.  WVU voluntarily reported results of its internal investigation to the NCAA, and the university was not penalized as a result of the infractions.  The focus of the investigation, Jonathan Hargett, was banned from WVU athletics for his role in the reported violations.

At the end of the 2008 season he served as the interim head coach at Indiana University, following Kelvin Sampson's resignation due to NCAA recruiting violations. Under Dakich's guidance, the Hoosiers went 0–2 in postseason play, losing in the first rounds of the Big 10 and NCAA tournaments. After the season, IU declined to offer Dakich the job and hired Tom Crean.

Television and radio career
Dakich was the host of "The Dan Dakich Show" on Indianapolis radio station WFNI, ESPN radio affiliate, 1070 The Fan.  Dakich served as a college basketball studio analyst for the Big Ten Network for the 2009–2010 college basketball season. Beginning in November 2010, Dakich joined ESPN as a college basketball color commentator and studio analyst, replacing Steve Lavin.

Relationship with Bob Knight 
Dakich spent 16 years with Knight, four as a player and twelve as an assistant. Dakich has said the reason he stayed so long, was Knight promised him that he would be Knight's successor at IU. In recent years their relationship has deteriorated. In 2017 Dakich said that he had 'lost all respect' for Knight after Knight failed to attend a ceremony honoring the undefeated 1976 IU basketball team.

Controversy 
In October 2019, Dakich was suspended from his show for failing "to adhere to the journalistic principles valued by" Emmis Communications, which owns WFNI.

In March 2020, Dakich responded to the firing of Scottsburg (IN) High School basketball coach Brent Jameson by "calling a player a 'methhead', urging listeners to go 'take a dump' in Scottsburg and threatening, 'I may just drive down there and beat the hell out of every school board member. He also called Scottsburg "a town full of 'meth and AIDS and needles. Dakich responded by saying, "Tone is important people. . . . Sometimes you can’t get tone out of newspaper articles and things. Sometimes what's funny when said or trying to be funny doesn't come across."

According to reporter Ian Kennedy, Dakich criticized Dr. Nathan Kalman-Lamb and Dr. Johanna Mellis, co-hosts of The End of Sport podcast, using "sexist and misogynistic" language for their discussion of the ways college athletes are mistreated and exploited. Dakich reportedly called Kalman-Lamb "a d-bag" and declined going at it' in a pool with Dr. Mellis, saying that if he did, because it was a public place, he’d 'have to get divorced.

Head coaching record

Personal 
Dakich married his first wife Jackie in 1990 and they divorced in 2012. They have two children together, Andrew and Laura. In 2015 Dakich married Leigh (Ross) Dakich.

References

External links
Bowling Green bio
Indiana bio

1962 births
Living people
Basketball coaches from Indiana
American men's basketball players
Basketball players from Gary, Indiana
Bowling Green Falcons men's basketball coaches
College basketball announcers in the United States
College men's basketball head coaches in the United States
Indiana Hoosiers men's basketball coaches
Indiana Hoosiers men's basketball players
People from Merrillville, Indiana
Sportspeople from Gary, Indiana
American men's basketball coaches
Sports YouTubers
YouTube podcasters